Kilcullen is a barony in County Kildare, Ireland.

Etymology
Kilcullen derives its name from the villages of Old Kilcullen and Kilcullen Bridge (Irish Cill Chuillinn, "holly church").

Location

Kilcullen barony is found in southeast County Kildare, reaching from Dún Ailinne to the border with County Wicklow.

History
Kilcullen barony was part of the ancient lands of the Ó Cuilen (Cullen) sept. These were part of the ancient lands of the Ua Tuathail (O'Tooles) before the 13th century, retaken in the 14th.

List of settlements

Below is a list of settlements in the Kilcullen barony:
Kilcullen

References

Baronies of County Kildare